The Euroregion Beskidy (Polish) or Euroregion Beskydy (Czech) is a Euroregion joining parts of the Poland, Czech Republic and Slovakia. It was created on 9 June 2000.

Main Cities
 Bielsko-Biała
 Frýdek-Místek
 Žilina

External links

Polish
Polish Euroregion website

Czech
Czech Euroregion website

Slovak
Slovak Euroregion website
Slovak Euroregion website (old)

Geography of the Czech Republic
Geography of Slovakia
Euroregions of Poland